The 2016 Indiana Hoosiers baseball team represented Indiana University during the 2016 NCAA Division I baseball season. The Hoosiers played their home games at Bart Kaufman Field as a member of the Big Ten Conference. They were led by head coach Chris Lemonis, in his second year at Indiana. The Hoosiers finished the season 32–24 (4th overall) in the 2016 Big Ten Conference baseball standings.

Previous season
In 2015, the Hoosiers finished 6th in the Big Ten Conference with a record of 35–24 overall and 12–10 in conference play. They qualified for the 2015 Big Ten Conference baseball tournament, and lost in the semifinals to Maryland. They qualified for the 2015 NCAA Division I baseball tournament and were placed in the Champaign Regional. The Hoosiers won their opening series against Radford, but lost to eventual College World Series runner up Vanderbilt in the second round of the regionals.

Roster

Schedule

! style="" | Regular Season
|- valign="top" 

|- bgcolor="#ccffcc"
| 1 || February 19 || vs   || Reese Smith Jr. Field • Murfreesboro, Tennessee, || 14–4 || 1–0 || –
|- bgcolor="#ffcccc"
| 2 || February 20 || vs Middle Tennessee || Reese Smith Jr. Field • Murfreesboro, Tennessee || 2–3 || 1–1 || –
|- bgcolor="#ffcccc"
| 3 || February 20 || vs Middle Tennessee || Reese Smith Jr. Field • Murfreesboro, Tennessee || 4–5 || 1–2 || –
|- bgcolor="#ffcccc"
| 4 || February 26 || vs   || Goodwin Field • Fullerton, California || 3–8 || 1–3 || –
|- bgcolor="#ffcccc"
| 5 || February 27 || at Cal State Fullerton || Goodwin Field • Fullerton, California || 2–3 || 1–4 || –
|- bgcolor="#ffcccc"
| 6 || February 28 || at Cal State Fullerton || Goodwin Field • Fullerton, California || 1–6 || 1–5 || –
|-

|- bgcolor="#ffcccc"
| 7 || March 3 || vs  || Charlotte Sports Park • Port Charlotte, Florida, || 2–7 || 1–6 || –
|- bgcolor="#ccffcc"
| 8 || March 4 || vs  || Charlotte Sports Park • Port Charlotte, Florida || 14–1 || 2–6 || –
|- bgcolor="#ffcccc"
| 9 || March 5 || vs Seton Hall || Charlotte Sports Park • Port Charlotte, Florida || 4–6 || 2–7 || –
|- bgcolor="#ccffcc"
| 10 || March 6 || vs  || Charlotte Sports Park • Port Charlotte, Florida || 2–1 || 3–7 || –
|- bgcolor="#ccffcc"
| 11 || March 11 ||  || Bart Kaufman Field • Bloomington, Indiana || 3–2 || 4–7 || –
|- bgcolor="#ffcccc"
| 12 || March 12 || Western Carolina || Bart Kaufman Field • Bloomington, Indiana || 1–4|| 4–8 || –
|- bgcolor="#ccffcc"
| 13 || March 12 || Western Carolina || Bart Kaufman Field • Bloomington, Indiana || 9–1 || 5–8 || –
|- bgcolor="#ccffcc"
| 14 || March 15 ||  || Charles H. Braun Stadium • Evansville, Indiana || 7–6|| 6–8 || –
|- bgcolor="#ccffcc"
| 15 || March 18 ||  || Bart Kaufman Field • Bloomington, Indiana || 9–6 || 7–8 || –
|- bgcolor="#ffcccc"
| 16 || March 19 || Toledo || Bart Kaufman Field • Bloomington, Indiana || 1–3 || 7–9 || –
|- bgcolor="#ccffcc"
| 17 || March 20 || Toledo || Bart Kaufman Field • Bloomington, Indiana || 8–0 || 8–9 || –
|- bgcolor="#ccffcc"
| 18 || March 20 || Toledo || Bart Kaufman Field • Bloomington, Indiana || 5–1 || 9–9 || –
|- bgcolor="#ccffcc"
| 19 || March 23 || Butler || Bart Kaufman Field • Bloomington, Indiana || 27–1 || 10–9 || –
|- bgcolor="#ccffcc"
| 20 || March 25 || at  || Bob Warn Field at Sycamore Stadium • Terre Haute, Indiana || 7–5 || 11–9 || –
|- bgcolor="#ffcccc"
| 21 || March 26 || Indiana State || Bart Kaufman Field • Bloomington, Indiana || 1–5 || 11–10 || –
|- bgcolor="#ccffcc"
| 22 || March 27 || Indiana State || Bart Kaufman Field • Bloomington, Indiana || 5–3 || 12–10 || –
|- bgcolor="#ffcccc"
| 23 || March 29 || Cincinnati || Bart Kaufman Field • Bloomington, Indiana || 0–5 || 12–11 || –
|- bgcolor="#bbbbbb"
| 24 || March 30 || Evansville || Bart Kaufman Field • Bloomington, Indiana || Cancelled || 12–11 || –
|-

|- bgcolor="#ffcccc"
| 25 || April 1 || at  || Bainton Field • Piscataway, New Jersey, || 1–7 || 12–12 || 0–1
|- bgcolor="#ffcccc"
| 26 || April 2 || at Rutgers || Bainton Field • Piscataway, New Jersey || 2–3 || 12–13 || 0–2
|- bgcolor="#ccffcc"
| 27 || April 2 || at Rutgers || Bainton Field • Piscataway, New Jersey || 9–2 || 13–13 || 1–2
|- bgcolor="#ccffcc"
| 28 || April 6 || at Cincinnati || Marge Schott Stadium • Cincinnati, Ohio, || 7–3 || 14–13 || 1–2
|- bgcolor="#ccffcc"
| 29 || April 8 ||  || Bart Kaufman Field • Bloomington, Indiana || 10–9 || 15–13 || 2–2
|- bgcolor="#ccffcc"
| 30 || April 9 || Purdue || Bart Kaufman Field • Bloomington, Indiana || 3–2 || 16–13 || 3–2
|- bgcolor="#ccffcc"
| 31 || April 10 || Purdue || Bart Kaufman Field • Bloomington, Indiana || 7–6 || 17–13 || 4–2
|- bgcolor="#ccffcc"
| 32 || April 13 ||  || Bart Kaufman Field • Bloomington, Indiana || 4–3 || 18–13 || 4–2
|- bgcolor="#ccffcc"
| 33 || April 15 ||  || Bart Kaufman Field • Bloomington, Indiana || 7–1 || 19–13 || 5–2
|- bgcolor="#ccffcc"
| 34 || April 16 || Iowa || Bart Kaufman Field • Bloomington, Indiana || 8–2 || 20–13 || 6–2
|- bgcolor="#ffcccc"
| 35 || April 17 || Iowa || Bart Kaufman Field • Bloomington, Indiana || 5–6 || 20–14 || 6–3
|- bgcolor="#ccffcc"
| 36 || April 20 ||  || J. Page Hayden Field • Cincinnati, Ohio, || 8–0 || 21–14 || 6–3
|- bgcolor="#ccffcc"
| 37 || April 22 || at  || Drayton McLane Baseball Stadium at John H. Kobs Field • East Lansing, Michigan, || 3–2 || 22–14 || 7–3
|- bgcolor="#ffcccc"
| 38 || April 23 || at Michigan State || Drayton McLane Baseball Stadium at John H. Kobs Field • East Lansing, Michigan || 0–9 || 22–15 || 7–4
|- bgcolor="#ccffcc"
| 39 || April 24 || at Michigan State || Drayton McLane Baseball Stadium at John H. Kobs Field • East Lansing, Michigan || 8–4 || 23–15 || 8–4
|- bgcolor="#ffcccc"
| 40 || April 26 || vs  || Victory Field • Indianapolis, Indiana || 0–5 || 23–16 || 8–4
|- bgcolor="#bbbbbb"
| 41 || April 27 || Xavier || Bart Kaufman Field • Bloomington, Indiana || Cancelled || 23–16 || 8–4
|- bgcolor="#ccffcc"
| 42 || April 29 ||  || Bart Kaufman Field • Bloomington, Indiana || 2–1 || 24–16 || 9–4
|- bgcolor="#ccffcc"
| 43 || April 29 || Northwestern || Bart Kaufman Field • Bloomington, Indiana || 4–3 || 25–16 || 10–4
|-

|- bgcolor="#ccffcc"
| 44 || May 1 || Northwestern || Bart Kaufman Field • Bloomington, Indiana || 7–6 || 26–16 || 11–4
|- bgcolor="#ccffcc"
| 45 || May 6 || at  || Siebert Field • Minneapolis, Minnesota, || 12–8 || 27–16 || 12–4
|- bgcolor="#ffcccc"
| 46 || May 7 || at Minnesota || Siebert Field • Minneapolis, Minnesota || 6–8 || 27–17 || 12–5
|- bgcolor="#ccffcc"
| 47 || May 8 || at Minnesota || Siebert Field • Minneapolis, Minnesota || 3–2 || 28–17 || 13–5
|- bgcolor="#ccffcc"
| 48 || May 10 ||  || Bart Kaufman Field • Bloomington, Indiana || 3–2 || 29–17 || 13–5
|- bgcolor="#ffcccc"
| 49 || May 13 ||  || Bart Kaufman Field • Bloomington, Indiana || 1–2 || 29–18 || 13–6
|- bgcolor="#ccffcc"
| 50 || May 14 || Illinois || Bart Kaufman Field • Bloomington, Indiana || 3–1 || 30–18 || 14–6
|- bgcolor="#ccffcc"
| 51 || May 15 || Illinois || Bart Kaufman Field • Bloomington, Indiana || 4–1 || 31–18 || 15–6
|- bgcolor="#ffcccc"
| 52 || May 17 || at  || Jim Patterson Stadium • Louisville, Kentucky, || 2–9 || 31–19 || 15–6
|- bgcolor="#ffcccc"
| 53 || May 19 || at  || Haymarket Park • Lincoln, Nebraska, || 1–4 || 31–20 || 15–7
|- bgcolor="#ffcccc"
| 54 || May 20 || at Nebraska || Haymarket Park • Lincoln, Nebraska || 0–2 || 31–21 || 15–8
|- bgcolor="#ffcccc"
| 55 || May 21 || at Nebraska || Haymarket Park • Lincoln, Nebraska || 0–3 || 31–22 || 15–9
|-

|-
! style="" | Post-Season
|- 

|- bgcolor="#ffcccc"
| 56 || May 25 || vs  || TD Ameritrade Park Omaha • Omaha, Nebraska, || 3–5 || 31–23 || –
|- bgcolor="#ccffcc"
| 57 || May 26 || vs  || TD Ameritrade Park Omaha • Omaha, Nebraska || 6–2 || 32–23 || –
|- bgcolor="#ffcccc"
| 58 || May 27 || vs Maryland || TD Ameritrade Park Omaha • Omaha, Nebraska || 0–3 || 32–24 || –
|-

Awards and honors

Big Ten Players of the Week

Award Watch List

Awards

MLB Draft
Four players were selected in the 2016 MLB Draft.

 Craig Dedelow declined to sign with the Pirates and returned to Indiana for his senior year.

References

Indiana
Indiana Hoosiers baseball seasons
2016 in sports in Indiana